Dear Lemon Lima is a 2009 family comedy feature film written and directed by Suzi Yoonessi.  Based on her short film of the same name and developed with the support of Film Independent and its Filmmaker Labs, this film is about a 13-year-old half-Yup’ik girl navigating her way through first heartbreak and the perils of prep school in Fairbanks, Alaska.  In learning the meanings of love, friendship, and community, Vanessa Lemor finds her voice by embracing her heritage and reclaiming the spirit of the World Eskimo Indian Olympics (WEIO) at a private school where her narcissistic sweetheart's family is legendary.

Plot
Vanessa Lemor, a lonely 13-year old Yup’ik girl with a vivid imagination, is dumped by her true love, über intellectual Philip Georgey, 14.  Vanessa spends the summer in Fairbanks, Alaska, working at an ice cream shack and obsessing over the heartbreaking tragedy.  After numerous unsuccessful attempts at erasing fond memories, she resolves to win Philip back at Nichols Academy (named after Yoonessi's alma mater, Nichols School), a close-minded preparatory school where the Georgey family is legendary.

Awarded the only minority scholarship, Vanessa's new life is a nightmare.  Back from the summer abroad and fluent in French, Philip is elevated to popular status, while Vanessa is relegated to the bottom of the prep school caste system with the rest of the FUBARs.  Rounding out the rest of the FUBARs are Hercules, a loveable, but socially inept boy with wildly overprotective parents, Samantha, a 14-year-old who claims her father is a rapper, and Nothing (formally known as Madeline), whose family owns a funeral parlor.  Vanessa's consolation prize is Philip's decision to honor Vanessa by being her student advisor.  Philip, wishing the best for his pupil, reinstates the values that once brought them together – the pursuit of individuality and embracement of a social consciousness: an alternative lifestyle for a better world.  Unfortunately, Vanessa misinterprets his preaching, and alienates herself by presenting an anarchist essay at the opening school ceremony.  To make matters worse, she is the only freshman captain selected for the school's infamous Snowstorm Survivor competition, an event inspired by the Native events in the World Eskimo Indian Olympics.

Vanessa believes that a victory in the Snowstorm Survivor championship is the only way into Philip's heart.  She quickly forms a quirky team with her fan base in the weight room.  Team FUBAR prepares for the event, driven by Vanessa's plight for her true love.  Unlike the Native Olympics that brings together people of all sizes and shapes to celebrate Native Alaskan culture, Nichols’ Snowstorm Survivor simply perverts the traditional Eskimo games in order to foster an antiquated class system.

After the tragic loss of a beloved teammate, Vanessa discovers the true meaning of love and must embrace her Native heritage to reclaim the spirit of the World Eskimo Indian Olympics.

Release
Dear Lemon Lima premiered on June 20, 2009 at the Los Angeles Film Festival and was released theatrically on March 4, 2011.
Actor Shayne Topp won the LAFF award for "Outstanding Performance" in the Narrative competition for his performance in Dear Lemon Lima. In bestowing Shayne Topp with Outstanding Performance recognition, the Jury stated:
"For his sophisticated and nuanced comic performance in a role that is often played in less subtle ways by more experienced actors, the award goes to Shayne Topp from Dear Lemon Lima."
Dear Lemon Lima received the Audience Award for Best Narrative Feature at their U.S. East Coast premiere at the Woodstock Film Festival and premiered internationally at the Rome International Film Festival.  
Dear Lemon Lima is distributed by Phase 4 Films and by HBO/Cinemax in Eastern Europe.

Production
The film was shot in Seattle.

Cast
 Savanah Wiltfong as Vanessa Lemor
 Shayne Topp as Philip Georgey
 Zane Huett as Hercules Howard
 Melissa Leo as Mrs. Howard
 Maia Lee as Madeline "Nothing" Amigone
 Beth Grant as Principal Applebomb
 Elaine Hendrix as Coach Roach
 Eleanor Hutchins as Terri Lemor
 Meaghan Martin as Megan Kennedy
 Kari Nissena as Norma
 Vanessa Marano as Samantha Combs
 Jada Morrison as Emmaline Chin
 Taylor Finlon as Lynne Chin
 Chase Wright Vanek as Jon Mongory
 Emma Noelle Roberts as Kellie
 Dusty Sager as David

References

External links
  
 
 Teen readies to walk the red carpet at film premiere at Alaska Star
 Vanessa Marano in Dear Lemon Lima at Crushable.com

2009 films
Films set in Alaska
Films shot in Seattle
Features based on short films
2000s English-language films
2009 comedy films
2000s American films